Calicium carolinianum is a species of lichen in the family Caliciaceae. It is endemic to the Gulf Coastal Plain region of the United States. The lichen contains norstictic acid, and has ascospores that measure 13–17 by 8–9 μm.

Taxonomy
The lichen was originally described as Acolium carolinianum by American botanist Edward Tuckerman in 1872. He discovered it in South Carolina, after which the species is named. Leif Tibell transferred it to the genus Thelomma in 1976. In 2016, Maria Prieto and Mats Wedin proposed a transfer to the genus Calicium, "until molecular investigations can clarify its position".

References

carolinianum
Lichen species
Lichens of the Southeastern United States
Lichens described in 1872
Taxa named by Edward Tuckerman
Fungi without expected TNC conservation status